Benedikt Dorsch was the defending champion, but he chose to not start this year.
Mikhail Kukushkin defeated Illya Marchenko 6–4, 6–2 in the final.

Seeds

Draw

Final four

Top half

Bottom half

References
 Main Draw
 Qualifying Draw

Penza Cup - Singles
Penza Cup
2009 in Russian tennis